Butera is a surname. Notable people with the surname include:

Ariana Grande-Butera (born 1993), American actress and singer-songwriter, known professionally as Ariana Grande
Drew Butera (born 1983), American baseball player
Faustin Butéra (born 1955), Rwandan sprinter
Ismail Butera, accordionist plays with such klezmer bands as Hot Pstromi and Metropolitan Klezmer
Jeanne Ingabire Butera (born 1990), Rwandan singer, known professionally as Knowless
Lou Butera (1937-2015), American pool player
Peace Butera, Ugandan culinary artist
Robert Butera (born 1935), American politician
Sal Butera (born 1952), American baseball player, father of Drew
Sam Butera (1927-2009), American saxophonist and bandleader
Scott Butera, American businessman and Arena Football League Commissioner

See also

Italian-language surnames
Surnames of Italian origin